Frank Connor (13 February 1936 – 3 March 2022) was a Scottish football player and manager.

Career
As a player, he played for Celtic, Portadown, St Mirren, Derry City, Albion Rovers and Cowdenbeath. After coaching at Celtic and Albion Rovers, Connor moved to Cowdenbeath in 1974 as player-manager, before a spell as assistant manager at Morton.  He managed Berwick Rangers between 1980 and 1982 and then had a spell working under Jock Wallace at Motherwell as assistant manager.

In the summer of 1983, Connor moved back to Celtic as new manager David Hay's assistant. He spent  years in that role at Parkhead until he was sacked by Hay in February 1986. He then went to manage Raith Rovers from 1986 to 1990. Connor led Raith Rovers to promotion to the Scottish First Division in his first season in charge there, and succeeded in keeping them in that division for the remainder of his tenure as manager. After leaving Raith Rovers in 1990, Connor had a spell at Hearts as assistant to manager Joe Jordan.

In June 1993, Connor returned once again to Celtic, this time as part of Liam Brady's new backroom team. He was joined at Celtic by his former boss at Hearts, Joe Jordan.

In October 1993 following the departures of Brady and Jordan, Connor took over as caretaker manager of Celtic for four games. He was in charge for two Scottish Premier Division matches (one win, one draw) a UEFA Cup tie first leg (won 1–0 against Sporting CP), and he picked the team to face Rangers (a 2–1 Premier Division Celtic win) three days after Lou Macari's arrival. Connor had an unbeaten record in charge of Celtic.

Personal life
Connor died on 3 March 2022, at the age of 86.

References

External links

The CelticWiki Caretaker and Temporary Managers

1936 births
2022 deaths
Footballers from Airdrie, North Lanarkshire
Scottish footballers
Association football goalkeepers
Blantyre Celtic F.C. players
Celtic F.C. players
Portadown F.C. players
St Mirren F.C. players
Derry City F.C. players
Albion Rovers F.C. players
Cowdenbeath F.C. players
Scottish football managers
Scottish Football League managers
Greenock Morton F.C. non-playing staff
Cowdenbeath F.C. managers
Celtic F.C. non-playing staff
Berwick Rangers F.C. managers
Raith Rovers F.C. managers